Kuisma Taipale (born 15 February 1970 in Veteli) is a Finnish cross-country skier. He represented Finland at the 2002 Winter Olympics in Salt Lake City, where he competed in the 15 km, the 50 km, and the relay.

He is the son of Hannu Taipale.

Cross-country skiing results
All results are sourced from the International Ski Federation (FIS).

Olympic Games

World Championships

World Cup

Season standings

Team podiums

 3 podiums

References

External links

1970 births
Living people
People from Veteli
Finnish male cross-country skiers
Cross-country skiers at the 2002 Winter Olympics
Olympic cross-country skiers of Finland
Sportspeople from Central Ostrobothnia
21st-century Finnish people